Religion in Syria refers to the range of religions practiced by the citizens of Syria. Historically, the region has been a mosaic of diverse faiths with a range of different sects within each of these religious communities. The majority of Syrians are Muslims, of which the Sunnis are the most numerous (formed mostly of Arabs, Kurds, Turkmens, and Circassians), followed by the Shia groups (particularly Alawites, Isma'ilis and Twelver Shi’ism), and Druzes. In addition, there are several Christian minorities (including Greek Orthodox, Greek Catholics, Armenian Orthodox, Armenian Catholics, Syriac Orthodox, Syriac Catholics, Nestorians, Chaldeans, Maronites, Latin Catholics and Protestants). There is also a small Jewish and Yazidi community.

Islam

Sunnis

The largest religious group in Syria are Sunni Muslims, who make up about 74% of the population, of whom Arabic-speaking Sunnis form the majority, followed by the Kurds, Turkmens/Turkomans, Circassians, and Palestinians. The capital cities of eleven of the fourteen governorates have Sunni majority populations, except for the cities of Latakia, Tartus, and Suwayda.

Sunnis follow nearly all occupations, belong to all social groups and nearly every political party, and live in all parts of the country. There are only three governorates in which they are not a majority: Al-Suwayda, where Druzes predominate, Latakia, where Alawis are a majority, and Tartus, where Alawis are also a majority. In Al Hasakah, Sunni Kurds rather than Arabs form a majority.

Of the four major schools of Islamic law, represented in Syria are the Shafii school and the Hanafi school, which places greater emphasis on analogical deduction and bases decisions more on precedents set in previous cases than on literal interpretation of the Quran or Sunna. After the first coup d'état in 1949, the waqfs were taken out of private religious hands and put under government control. Civil codes have greatly modified the authority of Islamic laws, and before the recent upsurge in Islamism during the Syrian civil war, the educational role of Muslim religious leaders had been declining with the gradual disappearance of kuttabs, the traditional mosque-affiliated schools. Syria maintains a dual system of sharia and civil courts.

According to the US government's 2012 International Religious Freedom Report, the government of Syria was increasingly targeting members of faith groups it deemed a threat. The report said the Sunni majority is the primary persecuted group.

Arabs
Arab Sunnis form the largest Sunni Muslim community in the country. They form a majority of Sunnis in all districts of the country except for the Al-Hasakah Governorate.

In 1991, Professor Alasdair Drysdale and Professor Raymond Hinnebusch said that approximately 60% of the country was formed of Arabic-speaking Sunni Muslims. More recently, Dr. Pierre Beckouche  also said that the Arab Sunni Muslims formed 60% of the population, including 500,000 Palestinian refugees.

Although the majority of Sunni Syrians are considered "Arabs", this is a term based on spoken language (Arabic), not ethnicity. Some Muslim minorities in Syria have been Arabized to some degree, particularly the smaller ethnic groups (such as the Albanians, Bosnians, Cretan Muslims, Pashtuns, Persians, etc.). Moreover, there are also some members of the larger communities, particularly within the Kurdish and Turkmen/Turkoman minorities, who no longer speak their mother tongue and have become Arabized.

Kurds

The Kurds in Syria are the second largest ethnic group in the country (around 10% in 2013) and are mainly Sunni Muslims. The majority live in Syrian Kurdistan, bordering on Iraqi Kurdistan and Turkish Kurdistan. There are also smaller Kurdish communities in Aleppo and Damascus. Damascus Kurds are very Arabized and do not usually speak Kurdish. The only governorate in which Kurds constitute a majority is the Hasakah Governorate, where they make up 60% of the population.

In 1979, Dr. Nikolaos van Dam said that the Syrian Kurds formed 8.5% of the population and were almost exclusively Sunni Muslims. In 1991, Professor Alasdair Drysdale and Professor Raymond Hinnebusch  also said that approximately 8.5% of the country was formed of Sunni Muslim Kurds. More recently, Dr. Pierre Beckouche said that before 2011 the Sunni Muslim Kurds formed 9–10% of the country's total population.

Turkmens

The Turkish-speaking Turkmen/Turkoman are the third largest ethnic group in the country (around 4%–5% in 2013) and are mainly Sunni Muslims. They mainly live in the urban centres and countryside of the following six governorates: the Aleppo Governorate, the Damascus Governorate, the Homs Governorate, the Hama Governorate, the Latakia Governorate and the Quneitra Governorate.

In 1979, Dr. Nikolaos van Dam claimed that the Syrian Turkmen/Turkoman (forming 3% of the population) were almost exclusively Sunni Muslims. By 1991 Professor Alasdair Drysdale and Professor Raymond Hinnebusch also said that approximately 3% of the country was formed of Sunni Muslim Turkmen/Turkoman. More recently, Dr. Pierre Beckouche  said that before 2011 the Sunni Muslim Turkmen/Turkoman formed 4% of the country's population.

However, the Sunni Turkmen population is believed to be considerably higher if Arabized Turkmen are also taken into consideration; some estimations indicate that only 30% of Turkmen still speak their mother tongue, therefore, the Arabic-speaking Turkmen are likely to be omitted from the Sunni Turkmen population estimates.

Circassians

Most Circassians in Syria are Sunni Muslims. They form the fifth largest ethnic group in the country (around 1.5% in 2013)  but the fourth largest Sunni Muslim community in Syria. They live mostly in three Syrian governorates: the Hama Governorate,  the Homs Governorate and the Quneitra Governorate. Most Circassians speak very good Arabic but they have also retained their mother tongue.

In 1991, Professor Alasdair Drysdale and Professor Raymond Hinnebusch said that less than 1% of the country was formed of Sunni Muslim Circassians.

Shias

Other Muslims in the country, who do not practice Sunni Islam, form up to 16% of the population and are formed of mostly Alawites (11%) and other Shias (such as Ismailis). These Muslim sects include diverse ethnic groups, including: Arabs, Kurds, Turkmen/Turkoman, and other smaller communities.

Alawites

The Alawites are the second largest religious group in Syria, after the Sunni Muslims. They are divided into two main groups: traditional Alawites, who form the majority, and the minority Murshid Alawites (which rose from a modern schism in the Alawite sect at the beginning of the 20th century).

In 1991, Professor Alasdair Drysdale and Professor Raymond Hinnebusch said that approximately Alawites formed 11.5% of the country's population. More recently, Dr. Pierre Beckouche  said that 11% of the country's population was Alawites.

The Alawites mainly live in the Syrian Coastal Mountain Range, particularly in the countryside of the Latakia governorate and the Tartus Governorate on the western side of the mountains, and in the countryside of the Homs Governorate and Hama Governorate on their eastern side. They form a majority (around 60%) in Latakia and Tartus. In the Homs and Hama areas, they make up around 10% of the population in both the countryside and the cities, living in Talkalakh, Al-Mukharram, Al-Qabo, Shin, Al-Riqama, the Houla plain, Maryamin, Qarmas, Al Muhani, and the areas of Zahra and Naziha.

A third of the 250,000 Alawite men of military age have been killed fighting in the Syrian Civil War. The Alawites have suffered as a result of their support for the Assad government against the mainly Sunni Arab opposition.

Ismailis
The Ismailis form the second largest Shia group in the country. According to Professor Alasdair Drysdale and Professor Raymond Hinnebusch the Ismailis formed 1.5% of the country's population in 1991.

They mainly in live in two governorates: in the Hama Governorate the Ismailis mainly live in the city of Salamiyah, which is considered to be the "Ismaili capital". They also live in the city of Masyaf and in the surrounding countryside, as well as a small minority living in the city of Hama. In addition, Ismailis also live in the Tartus Governorate, particularly in the town of Qadmus and its surrounding countryside and in the district and villages of Nahr al-Khawabi.

Twelvers

The Twelvers/Imamis form the smallest of the Islamic sects in Syria, making up around 0.5% of the population. They live in the Amin neighbourhood in Damascus and in two villages close to Aleppo. The Ja’afari Shi’ites are found mainly in Qadmus, in the Tartous Governorate.

In Damascus, there are Twelvers/Imamis living near to the Shia pilgrimage sites, especially in the al-Amara-quarter which is near to Umayyad Mosque and Sayyidah Ruqayya Mosque, and around Sayyidah Zaynab Mosque. Another important site is Bab Saghir Cemetery. The Shia Twelvers in Syria have close links to the Lebanese Shi'a Twelvers. Imami Shias are also found in villages in Idlib, Homs and Aleppo provinces.

Alevis 

In northern Syria, there are some Kurdish and Turkmen Alevis. The town of Maabatli in Afrin District is mainly inhabited by Kurdish Alevis. In 2014, the Alevi Hêvî Îbrahîm became the Prime Minister of the then-Kurdish controlled Afrin Canton. Thousands of Turkmen Alevis were living in Aleppo, and a significant portion of these fled to Turkey.

Druze

The Syrian Druze community constitute the third largest Islamic sects in the country, forming approximately 3% of the population of Syria. The main centre of the Druze population is in As-Suwayda; the small towns and villages under its authority is called the Jabal al-Druze (the "Mountain of the Druze"). The rest of the community mainly live in the Quneitra Governorate, the Rif Dimashq Governorate, and the Idlib Governorate. Even though the faith originally developed out of Ismaili Islam, most Druze do not identify as Muslims, and they do not accept the five pillars of Islam.

There are many Syrian Druze also living abroad, particularly in Latin America, who have been living there for over the past hundred years. In Venezuela alone, there are approximately half a million Druze of Syrian origin.

Christianity

The Christian communities of Syria in 2012 accounted for about 5–6% of the population and were divided into five traditions. A primary distinguishing feature is acceptance or otherwise of the 3rd and 4th Ecumenical Councils of 431 and 451, which concerned the precise relationship of the human and divine natures of Christ. The traditions are: Oriental Orthodox (Armenian Orthodox and Syriac Orthodox) which accept the 3rd Ecumenical Council, Eastern Orthodox (such as Greeks or Russians), Roman Catholics, various Eastern Catholic Churches that are under the authority of the Pope, and Protestants who accept the 4th Ecumenical Council (two natures before and after the Incarnation in one person). The Assyrians accept only the First and Second and deny being Nestorian in doctrine (two natures in a personal non-essential union).

The Syriacs reject the 4th Council, denying being monophysites (one nature, the human being subsumed into the divine) and asserting instead that they are miaphytes (two natures united as one in one person, without separation, mixture, confusion or alteration). The East Syriac (Syro-Oriental) Rite is represented by the Assyrian Church of the East, Chaldean Catholic and Ancient Church of the East. Members of the Syriac tradition are all Eastern Aramaic-speaking ethnic Assyrians. Slight differences concerning which books of the Bible are counted as canonical are also apparent.

The total number of Christians before 2011, not including Iraqi refugee Christians, numbered about 5-6% (1.1-1.2 million) of the total population estimate (22.5 million): 500,000 Greek Orthodox, 400,000 Syriac Orthodox, 70,000–80,000 Armenian Christians (Apostolics and Catholics), 200,000 Catholics of various rites and the Assyrian Church of the East (Assyrian) numbers unknown, and Protestants. Because Protestantism was introduced by missionaries, a small number of Syrians are members of these Western denominations. The Catholics are divided into several groups: Greek Catholics (from a schism in the Greek Orthodox Patriarchate of Antioch in 1724), Latin Rite, Armenian Catholics, Syriac Catholics, Chaldean Catholics and Maronites. The latter declared their allegiance to the See of St. Peter in 1182 which was confirmed by the Pope in 1100: the other Orthodox and Oriental Orthodox Rite Christians which are in union with the Papacy came into existence in the 18th and 19th centuries. Catholic and Orthodox Christians were members of one Church until 1054. The Orthodox Patriarch of Antioch ignored the split: technically this Church was in union with both Rome and Constantinople until the split in 1724 over a disputed election (the irony is that the excommunication of the Patriarch by the Pope in 1054 was invalid since he was already dead when it was delivered in Constantinople).

The vast majority of Christians belong to the Eastern communions, which have existed in Syria since the earliest days of Christianity. The Orthodox churches are autonomous; the Uniate churches, which are in communion with Rome; and the Assyrian Church of the East is independent. Even though each group forms a separate community, Christians nevertheless cooperate increasingly, largely because of their fear of the Muslim majority. In 1920 Syria was 12% Christian in a population of 1.5 million.  Christians have emigrated in higher numbers than Muslims and have a lower birth rate.

With the exception of the Armenians and Assyrians, most Syrian Christians identify ethnically as Arab Christians. Many Christians, particularly the Eastern Orthodox, have joined the Arab nationalist movement and some are changing their Aramaic or Westernized names to Arabic ones. Syrian Christians participate higher proportionally speaking in political and administrative affairs than do Muslims. Especially among the young, relations between Christians and Muslims are improving.

There are several social differences between Christians and Muslims. For example, Syrian Christians are more highly urbanized than Muslims; many live either in or around Damascus, Aleppo, Hamah, or Latakia, and there are relatively fewer of them in the lower income groups. Syrian Christians are relatively wealthy and highly educated than other Syrian religious groups. Proportionately more Christians than Muslims are educated beyond the primary level, and there are relatively more of them in white-collar and professional occupations. The education that Christians receive has differed in kind from that of Muslims in the sense that many more children of Christian parents have attended Western-oriented foreign and private schools. With their higher urbanization, income, and educational levels, the Christians have therefore somewhat the same relation to other Syrians as the Jewish community formerly did before most Jews left for Israel.

The presence of the Christian communities is expressed also by the presence of many monasteries in several parts of the country.

Judaism

Most Jews now living in the Arab World belong to communities dating back to Biblical times or originating as colonies of refugees fleeing the Spanish Inquisition.

Syrian Jews

In Syria, Jews of both origins, numbering altogether fewer than 3,000 in 1987, are found. After a mass emigration in 1992, today fewer than 200 Jews live in Syria, m
The government treats the Jews as a religious community and not as a racial group. Official documents refer to them as musawiyin (followers of Moses) and not yahudin (Jews).

Although the Jewish community continues to exercise a certain authority over the personal status of its members, as a whole it is under considerable restriction, more because of political factors than religious ones. The economic freedom of Jews is limited, and they are under continual surveillance by the police. Their situation, although not good before the June 1967 War, has reportedly deteriorated considerably since then.

The synagogues of the Jewish community have a protected status by the Syrian government.

Israeli Jews
The Golan Heights, which is internationally recognized as part of Syria, has been occupied and governed by Israel since the Six-Day War. It has resulted in the region being settled by an influx of Israeli Jews who have become the overall majority. In 2010, the Jewish settlers had expanded to 20,000 living in 32 settlements.

Yazidis

During the fifteenth and sixteenth centuries, the Yazidis, whose religion dates back to pre-Islamic times, migrated from southern Turkey and settled in their present mountainous stronghold – Jabal Sinjar in northeastern Syria and Iraq. Although some are scattered in Iran, Turkey, and the Caucasus, Iraq is the center of their religious life, the home of their amir, and the site (north of Mosul) of the tomb of their most revered saint, Shaykh Adi.

In 1964, there were about 10,000 Yazidis in Syria, primarily in the Jazirah and northwest of Aleppo; population data were not available in 1987. Once seminomadic, most Yazidis now are settled; they have no great chiefs and, although generally Kurdish-speaking or Arabic speaking, gradually are being assimilated into the surrounding Arab population.

Yazidis generally refuse to discuss their faith which, in any case, is known fully to only a few among them. The Yazidi religion has elements of Mesopotamian religions.

Folk spiritual beliefs

In addition to the beliefs taught by the organized religions, many people believe strongly in powers of good and evil and in the efficacy of local saints. The former beliefs are especially marked among the bedouin, who use amulets, charms, and incantations as protective devices against the evil power of jinns (spirits) and the evil eye. Belief in saints is widespread among non-beduin populations. Most villages contain a saint's shrine, often the grave of a local person considered to have led a particularly exemplary life. Believers, especially women, visit these shrines to pray for help, good fortune, and protection. Although the identification of the individual with their religious community is strong, belief in saints is not limited to one religious group. Persons routinely revere saints who were members of other religious communities and, in many cases, members of various faiths pray at the same shrine.

Unorthodox religious beliefs of this kind are probably more common among women than men. Because they are excluded by the social separation of the sexes from much of the formal religious life of the community, women attempt to meet their own spiritual needs through informal and unorthodox religious beliefs and practices, which are passed on from generation to generation.

Hinduism
There were 2,041 (0.01%) Hindus in Syria in 2010 according to ARDA.

Census statistics
There has been no official census on Religion in Syria since the sixties.

1960 unofficial census with religious data: 
Sunni Muslims:       75%
Alawites:           11%
Ismailis             1%
Druzes:               3%
Total Muslims:      92.1% (4,053,349)
Total Christians:    7.8% (344,621)
Jews:                0.1% (4,860)
Other:                 0% (342)
Total:             100% (4,403,172)

In the next census of 1970, the religion statistics were no longer mentioned.

Religion and law

In matters of personal status, such as birth, marriage, and inheritance, the Christian, Jewish, and Druze minorities follow their own legal systems. All other groups, in such matters, come under the jurisdiction of the Muslim code. However, in 2016 the de facto autonomous Federation of Northern Syria – Rojava for the first time in Syrian history introduced and started to promote civil marriage as a move towards a secular open society and intermarriage between people of different religious backgrounds.

Although the faiths theoretically enjoy equal legal status, to some extent Islam is favored. Despite guarantees of religious freedom, some observers maintain that the conditions of the non-Muslim minorities have been steadily deteriorating, especially since the June 1967 war. An instance of this deterioration was the nationalization of over 300 Christian schools, together with approximately 75 private Muslim schools, in the autumn of 1967. Since the early 1960s, heavy emigration of Christians has been noted; in fact, some authorities state that at least 50 percent of the 600,000 people who left during the decade ending in 1968 were Christians. In recent decades, however, emigration was slow until the Syrian Civil War.

See also
Freedom of religion in Syria
Human rights in Syria
Religion in Lebanon

References

Further reading
Marcel Stüssi, Models of Religious Freedom: Switzerland, the United States, and Syria by Analytical, Methodological, and Eclectic Representation, 2012, p. 375 ff.

External links 

 Sectarianism in Syria (Survey Study)
 Islamic Education in Syria